The tiger rattlesnake (Crotalus tigris) is a highly venomous pit viper species found in the southwestern United States and northwestern Mexico. No subspecies are currently recognized. The specific name tigris, (Latin for 'tiger'), refers to the many narrow dorsal crossbands, which create a pattern of vertical stripes when viewed from the side.

Taxonomy
American herpetologist Robert Kennicott described the tiger rattlesnake in 1859. Common names include tiger rattlesnake and tiger rattler.Description
The tiger rattlesnake is easily identified by its small, spade-shaped head, which is about 1/25 of its total body length. It has the smallest head of any rattlesnake, and a large rattle. The color pattern consists of a gray, lavender, blue-gray, pink, or buff ground color that usually turns to pink, pale orange, or cream on the sides. Tiger rattlesnakes are the only rattlesnake with crossbands on the anterior portion of their bodies, with a series of 35 to 52 gray, olive, or brown bands across the dorsum consisting mainly of heavy punctations. These crossbands have vague borders and are wider dorsally than laterally. Also mid-dorsally, the crossbands become wider than the spaces that separate them. Posteriorly, the crossbands become darker and more clearly defined. They have six to 10 posterior rings. The markings on the head are mostly vague and irregular, although towards the rear of the head, a few dark markings may be arranged as paired occipital blotches and upper temporal streaks. The most distinguishable mark on the head is a dark cheek strip. Dorsal scales are keeled and in 21 to 27 rows. Females have 164 to 177 ventral scales, and males have 158 to 172 ventral scales. Females have 16 to 21 caudal scales, and males have 23 to 27 caudal scales and are typically larger than females. They have relatively small eyes with elliptical pupils.

Distribution and habitat
The species' range extends from central Arizona south through south-central Arizona in the United States, to southern Sonora, Mexico, including Isla Tiburón in the Gulf of California and was recently discovered in the southern Peloncillo Mountains of Arizona. The type locality is described as "Sierra Verde and Pozo Verde". The latter is a spring located on the Sonora side of the US-Mexico border, near Sasabe. According to Stejneger (1893), this spring is on the western slope of the southern Sierra Verde, which is also known as the Sierra del Pozo Verde. In these areas, the tiger rattlesnake is observed at elevations from sea level to about  Reported occurrences at higher elevations have not been confirmed.

In southeastern Arizona, this snake occurs strictly in rocky areas in winter and spring, but uses edges of arroyos in summer. It is a terrestrial species, but may climb into low vegetation.

They rattlesnakes also inhabit escarpments, outcroppings, and cliff faces in thorny scrub desert habitat.

Little information is available concerning the average home range size of tiger rattlesnakes.

Behavior
Tiger rattlesnakes are terrestrial snakes and are nocturnal during the hot summer (June–August), but become diurnal and crepuscular during the fall season. They hibernate during the late fall and winter in rock crevices or animal burrows. In spite of being ground-dwelling, their activity is not restricted to the ground. Little information is available concerning communication and perception among tiger rattlesnakes. However, like other pit vipers, tiger rattlesnakes have heat-sensing pits (located on each side of the face between the eye and nostril) to detect warm-blooded predators and prey.

This snake is inactive in cold temperatures (December/January) and extreme heat (July/August). It may be active both day and night; daytime activity consists mainly of basking on cool days. These snakes are often observed being active after warm rains. In southeastern Arizona, they are active mainly from March to October.

Diet
Tiger rattlesnakes generally feed on mammals such as rodents, but they have also been known to prey on lizards. The tiger rattlesnake ambushes much of its prey, but also actively hunts for small rodents and lizards, with juveniles relying heavily on lizards and adults depending more on rodents. In addition, these small rattlesnakes have been known to eat fairly large prey, including pocket mice, kangaroo rats, deer mice, packrats, and even spiny lizards. This species' venom is considered the most toxic of all rattlesnakes, and contains a myotoxin known to cause muscle necrosis and a neurotoxin similar to Mojave toxin. Like all pit vipers, tiger rattlesnakes inject venom into prey through long, hollow, retractable fangs. If envenomated prey crawls into a small crevice, this species is especially suited for extracting it due to its unusually small head.

Predators
Little to no information is available regarding predators specific to tiger rattlesnakes. However, likely predators include hawks, eagles, coyotes, and other snakes. Their cryptic coloration helps camouflage them from potential predators and helps reduce risk of predation. If disturbed, they rapidly shake their rattles and may strike in defense. Tiger rattlesnakes are known to have an irascible temperament and are easily excitable and can be quite aggressive.

Reproduction
Tiger rattlesnakes are polygynandrous, and either the male, female, or both have more than one mate within a single breeding season. Little else is known of the reproductive behavior of this species. The reproductive behavior of this species is thought to be similar to that of C. atrox and C. scutulatus. Copulation in viperids can take minutes, hours, or days, and can occur several times within a few days.

Tiger rattlesnake females follow a biennial reproductive cycle. Males follow a seasonal reproductive cycle, where sperm is stored in the vasa deferentia during winter. Breeding occurs from late May to mid-August, during the summer monsoon season. Like the majority of rattlesnakes, tiger rattlesnakes are ovoviviparous. Mean clutch size for is five young. The smallest known sexually reproducing female measured  snout-vent length, while the smallest mature male measured ,

Generally, rattlesnakes invest little in offspring following birth. However, like other viperids, female tiger rattlesnakes invest in provisioning resources for developing embryos. She eats early in the pregnancy and then finds a safe place to hide while providing the optimal thermal environment for development.

Development
Tiger rattlesnake embryos are retained inside the female in a transparent, membranous sac, where some materials and gases are exchanged between embryo and mother. Embryos receive fluids and sustenance from the yolk mass. Once born, neonates break through the embryonic sac and travel a short distance to a safe nook with its siblings. Young tiger rattlesnakes are not born with a rattle. Neonates have a skin cap at the tip of the tail, and after every molt, a new rattle segment is added. Like all rattlesnakes, tiger rattlesnakes are ovoviviparous and thus, are well developed at birth.

Conservation status
This species is classified as "Least Concern" on the IUCN Red List of Threatened Species. Species are listed as such due to their wide distribution, presumed large population, or because they are unlikely to be declining fast enough to qualify for listing in a more threatened category. The population trend was stable when assessed in 2007.

Population
The population trend of the tiger rattlesnake is considered to be stable. On a range-wide scale, Campbell and Lamar (2004) mapped 33 collection sites. Lowe et al. (1986) stated the species is known from around 100 localities throughout the range. The adult population size is unknown, but presumably exceeds 10,000. This snake is fairly common in some areas, but "some local populations seem small". Its extent of occurrence, area of occupancy, number of subpopulations, and population size are probably relatively stable or declining at a rate of less than 10% over 10 years or three generations.

Threats
Southern populations on the flatter areas of the coastal plain of Sonora are probably losing habitat due to the intensification of agriculture. Overall, however, this species is not seriously threatened.

Relevance

Negative
Although tiger rattlesnakes are reluctant to strike, they are highly venomous and cantankerous, so pose a potential threat to humans. Their venom contains a neurotoxin  and a myotoxin known to cause muscle necrosis. Although production is low compared to other rattlesnakes, their venom is the third most toxic of any snake in the Western Hemisphere. The combination of toxins in their venom makes them extremely dangerous to humans.

Positive
In general, rattlesnake skin and tail rattles are often considered valuable and are often sold as souvenirs throughout the American Southwest. Rattlesnake venom is often used in biomedical research investigating neurological diseases. Finally, tiger rattlesnakes prey upon a number of rodent species considered pests by humans throughout their geographic range. Tiger rattlesnakes feed on a number of small vertebrate species and likely help regulate their abundance and distribution. No information reports parasites specific to this species.

Venom
Although it has a comparatively low venom yield, its toxicity is considered to be the second highest of all rattlesnake venoms (next to the mojave), and the second highest of all snakes in the Western Hemisphere. It has a high neurotoxic fraction that is antigenically related to Mojave toxin (see Crotalus scutulatus, venom A), and includes another component immunologically identical to crotamine, which is a myotoxin also found in tropical rattlesnakes (see Crotalus durissus). A low but significant protease activity is in the venom, although it does not seem to have any hemolytic activity.

Brown (1973) lists an average venom yield of 11 mg (dried venom) and an  value of 0.6 mg/kg IP for toxicity. Other studies give  values of 0.07 mg/kg IP, 0.056 mg/kg IV, and 0.21 mg/kg SC. Minton and Weinstein (1984) list an average venom yield of 6.4 mg (based on two specimens). Weinstein and Smith (1990) list a venom yield of 10 mg.

There is very little information available for bite symptoms. Human bites by the tiger rattlesnake are infrequent, and literature available on bites by this snake is scarce. The several recorded human envenomations by tiger rattlesnakes produced little local pain, swelling, or other reaction following the bite, and despite the toxicity of its venom no significant systemic symptoms. The comparatively low venom yield (6.4–11 mg dried venom) and short  to  fangs of the tiger rattlesnake possibly prevent severe envenoming in adult humans. However, the clinical picture could be much more serious if the person bitten was a child or a slight build individual. The early therapeutic use of antivenom is important if significant envenomation is suspected. Despite the low venom yield, a bite by this rattlesnake should be considered a life-threatening medical emergency. Untreated mortality rate is unknown but this snake has a very high venom toxicity and its bites are capable of producing major envenomation.

References

Further reading
 Kennicott, R. In Baird, S.F. 1859. Reptiles of the Boundary, with Notes by the Naturalists of the Survey. In Report of the United States and Mexican Boundary Survey, Under the Order of Lieut. Col. W.H. Emory, Major First Cavalry, and United States Commissioner, vol. 2, no. 2. Department of the Interior. Washington, District of Columbia. 35 pp.
 Klauber, L.M. 1956. Rattlesnakes: Their Habits, Life Histories and Influence on Mankind''. 2 volumes. University of California Press. Berkeley, California. 1,533 pp.
 Stejneger, L.H. 1893. Annotated List of the Reptiles and Batrachians Collected by the Death Valley Expedition in 1891, with Descriptions of New Species. North American Fauna, No. 7, Part II, pp. 159–228.

External links

 Crotalus tigris images at California Reptiles and Amphibians. Accessed 16 May 2007.
 Crotalus tigris at Reptiles and Amphibians of Arizona. Accessed 16 May 2007.

tigris
Snakes of North America
Reptiles of Mexico
Reptiles of the United States
Fauna of Gulf of California islands
Fauna of the Sonoran Desert
Fauna of the Southwestern United States
Reptiles described in 1859
Taxa named by Robert Kennicott